A ramrod is a device used with early firearms to push the projectile up against the propellant (mainly gunpowder).

Ramrod may also refer to:

Arts and entertainment

Films
 Ramrod (film), a 1947 Western film

Fictional characters
 Patrick Mahony, a mutant in the Marvel Universe and member of the Nasty Boys, also known as Ramrod
 Ramrod (Marvel Comics), a fictional villain in the Marvel Universe
 Ramrod, a robot and the transforming space ship in Saber Rider and the Star Sheriffs
 Ramrod, a fictional Los Angeles based pimp in Vice Squad (1982 film)

Music
 The Ramrods (instrumental group), an American group who had a hit in 1961 with "(Ghost) Riders in the Sky"
 The Ramrods (punk band), a punk rock band from Detroit in the late 1970s
 Ramrod (EP), an EP by Scraping Foetus Off the Wheel
 "Ramrod" (Duane Eddy song), a 1958 song by Duane Eddy, from the album Have 'Twangy' Guitar Will Travel
 "Ramrod" (Bruce Springsteen song), a 1980 song by Bruce Springsteen, from the album The River

Other uses
 Ramrod Herbicide, an early herbicide created by Monsanto in 1964
 RAMROD (Ride Around Mount Rainier in One Day), an annual bicycle ride sponsored by the Redmond Bicycle Club in Washington State
 Ram Rod, a nickname for Grateful Dead "head roadie" and corporate president Laurence Shurtliff (1947–2006)
 Ramrod, a type of bombing mission carried out by Royal Air Force in WWII
Operation Ramrod 16, an RAF bombing mission in 1943.